Russian Championship may refer to:

 Russian American Football Championship, the highest level of American football played in Russia
 Russian Artistic Gymnastics Championships, an annual Russian national artistic gymnastics competition
 Russian National Badminton Championships, a tournament organized to crown the best badminton players in Russia
 List of Russian bandy champions, a list of the winners of the final of the highest Russian bandy league played each year
 Russian Professional Basketball Championship
 Russian Chess Championship, a list of chess champions since before 1899
 Russian Curling Championships, a list of winners of the national curling championships since 1993
 Russian Figure Skating Championships, held annually to determine the national champions of Russia
 Russian Junior Figure Skating Championships, a list of the country's junior-level national champions
 Russian Football Championship, another name for the Russian Premier League, the top division professional association football league in Russia
 Russian Women's Football Championship, the highest professional women's football league in Russia
 Russian Formula 1600 Championship
 Russian Formula Three Championship
 Russian Women's Futsal Super League
 Russian Open golf championship, a tournament on the European Tour
 List of Soviet and Russian ice hockey champions, the organizations winning the Russian Open Hockey Championship ward and national title
 Russian National Road Race Championships
 Russian Rhythmic Gymnastics Championships, an annual national competition
 Russian Championship (rugby league), the major rugby league tournament for clubs in Russia
 Russian Individual Speedway Championship, a Motorcycle speedway championship held each year to determine the national champion
 Russian National Time Trial Championships, a cycling race held annually
 Russian Women's Water Polo Championship
 Russian Water Polo Championship

See also
 Russian Cup (disambiguation)